Abdiel Armando Ayarza Cocanegra (born 12 September 1992) is a Panamanian professional footballer who plays as midfielder for Peruvian Segunda División side Cusco FC and the Panama national team.

Playing career
On 24 July 2019, Ayarza signed with Cienciano in Peru after being named the best player in the 2018–19 season of the Liga Panameña de Fútbol. Ayarza made his professional debut with Cienciano on 2 February 2020 in a 2–1 Peruvian Primera División defeat to Academia Cantolao.

International career
Ayarza made his debut for the Panama national team in a 3–1 CONCACAF Nations League loss against Mexico on 15 October 2019.

He scored his first goal in a 1–0 friendly win over Costa Rica on 10 October 2020, and his second three days later, against the same opponent and with the same outcome.

Career statistics

International

International goals
As of match played 16 January 2022. Panama score listed first, score column indicates score after each Ayarza goal.

Honours
Santa Gema
Copa Panamá: 2016–17

CAI
Liga Panameña de Fútbol: 2019 Clausura

References

External links

1992 births
Living people
Sportspeople from Colón, Panama
Panamanian footballers
Panama international footballers
Panama youth international footballers
Association football midfielders
Cienciano footballers
Peruvian Primera División players
Liga Panameña de Fútbol players
Panamanian expatriate footballers
Panamanian expatriate sportspeople in Peru
Expatriate footballers in Peru
2021 CONCACAF Gold Cup players